Mount Janetschek is a mountain,  high, standing between Mount Larsen and Widowmaker Pass at the south side of the mouth of Reeves Glacier, in Victoria Land, Antarctica. It was mapped by the United States Geological Survey from surveys and U.S. Navy air photos, 1955–63, and was named by the Advisory Committee on Antarctic Names for Heinz Janetschek, a biologist at McMurdo Station in the 1961–62 season.

References

Mountains of Victoria Land
Scott Coast